CARM1 (coactivator-associated arginine methyltransferase 1), also known as PRMT4 (protein arginine N-methyltransferase 4), is an enzyme encoded by the  gene found in human beings, as well as many other mammals. It has a polypeptide (L) chain type that is 348 residues long, and is made up of alpha helices and beta sheets. Its main function includes catalyzing the transfer of a methyl group from S-Adenosyl methionine to the side chain nitrogens of arginine residues within proteins to form methylated arginine derivatives and S-Adenosyl-L-homocysteine. CARM1 is a secondary coactivator through its association with p160 family (SRC-1, GRIP1, AIB) of coactivators.  It is responsible for moving cells toward the inner cell mass in developing blastocysts.

Clinical significance
CARM1 plays an important role in androgen receptors and may play a role in prostate cancer progression.

CARM1 exerts both oncogenic and tumor-suppressive functions. In breast cancer, CARM1 methylates chromatin remodeling factor BAF155 to enhance tumor progression and metastasis. In pancreatic cancer, CARM1 methylates and inhibits MDH1 by disrupting its dimerization, which represses mitochondria respiration and inhibits glutamine utilization. CARM1-mediated MDH1 methylation reduces cellular NADPH level and sensitizes cells to oxidative stress, thereby suppressing cell proliferation and colony formation.

See also
 histone-arginine N-methyltransferase

External links

References

Transcription coregulators